is the 8th major-label single by the Japanese girl idol group Shiritsu Ebisu Chugaku. It was released in Japan on June 17, 2015, on the label Defstar Records.

Release details 
The CD single was released in three versions: a "regular edition" and two limited editions: a "Tour-venue Edition" (for sale only at concerts), and an "Online (ForTune Music) Edition" (for sale only online at ForTune Music). The differences between the editions are the cover art and the B-sides.

Reception 
The physical CD single debuted at number 2 in the Oricon daily singles chart. In the Oricon weekly singles chart, it debuted also at number 2.

Track listing

Regular Edition

Limited Tour-venue Edition

Limited Online (ForTune Music) Edition

Charts

References

External links 
 Discography on the Shiritsu Ebisu Chugaku official site

2015 singles
Japanese-language songs
Shiritsu Ebisu Chugaku songs
SME Records singles
2015 songs